Verkhnetseplyayevsky is a rural locality (a khutor) in Vishnyakovskoye Rural Settlement, Uryupinsky District, Volgograd Oblast, Russia. The population was 66 as of 2010. There are 5 streets.

Geography 
Verkhnetseplyayevsky is located in forest steppe, 25 km northeast of Uryupinsk (the district's administrative centre) by road. Serkovsky is the nearest rural locality.

References 

Rural localities in Uryupinsky District